Janko Tipsarević and Dušan Vemić were the defending champions; however, they lost to František Čermák and Michal Mertiňák in the first round.
Eric Butorac and Bobby Reynolds won in the final 5–7, 6–4, 10–4, against Jeff Coetzee and Jordan Kerr.

Seeds

Draw

Draw

External links
 Doubles Draw

BMW Tennis Championship - Doubles
BMW Tennis Championship